Marcin Juszczyk (born January 23, 1985 in Kraków) is a Polish football goalkeeper.

Career

Club
Juszczyk previously played for Górnik Wieliczka, Nea Salamis Famagusta FC and Wisła Kraków.

In July 2011, he joined Arka Gdynia.

References

External links
 

1985 births
Living people
Polish footballers
Polish expatriate footballers
Association football goalkeepers
Wisła Kraków players
Górnik Wieliczka players
Nea Salamis Famagusta FC players
Polonia Bytom players
Arka Gdynia players
Ekstraklasa players
Cypriot First Division players
Cypriot Second Division players
Expatriate footballers in Cyprus
Polish expatriate sportspeople in Cyprus
Footballers from Kraków